The 2009 Collector Swedish Open was a tennis tournament held in Båstad, Sweden. It was the 1st edition of the Collector Swedish Open. The women's singles section was played July 6–11, 2009. The winner was María José Martínez Sánchez, who defeated Caroline Wozniacki in the final by 7–5, 6–4. Participants and match results are listed below.

Seeds

Draw

Finals

Top half

Bottom half

External links 
Main draw
Qualifying draw

Swedish Open - Women's Singles
Swedish Open
2009 in Swedish women's sport
Swedish